Agadi is a village in the southern state of Karnataka, India. It is located in the Hubli taluk of Dharwad district.

Demographics
As of the 2011 Census of India there were 492 households in Agadi and a total population of 2,532 consisting of 1,344 males and 1,188 females. There were 335 children ages 0-6.

See also
 Dharwad
 Districts of Karnataka

References

External links
 http://Dharwad.nic.in/

Villages in Dharwad district